Landulf I may refer to:
Landulf I of Capua (died 843)
Landulf I of Benevento (died 943)
Landulf I (archbishop of Benevento) (died 982)